Abdel Hamid Sarraj (September 1925 – 23September 2013) was a Syrian Army officer and politician. When the union between Egypt and Syria was declared, Sarraj, a staunch Arab nationalist and supporter of Egyptian president Gamal Abdel Nasser, played a key role in the leadership of the Syrian region of the UAR.

Early life

Sarraj was born in Hama to a conservative Muslim family, of Kurdish descent. He joined the Homs Military Academy and was one of the first officers in the army after Syria's independence from France. Sarraj participated in the 1948 Arab-Israeli War, as a volunteer in the Arab Liberation Army. He led a detachment of six armored vehicles to surround Safad.

Political career
He played a role in the 1949 coup that removed Husni al-Zaim from power and took over the personnel department of Adib Shishakli's government in 1952. When Shishakli was ousted, Sarraj was temporarily sent to Paris as an assistant military attache. However, in March 1955, he was appointed head of the Syrian military intelligence. From this position, he was able to play a crucial role in preventing conspiracies against the government. Sarraj did not join any political parties, but cooperated with the ones in power, in particular against the Ba'ath. In September 1957, he helped negotiate the landing of 4,000 Egyptian troops in Latakia as part of defence pact made between the two countries.

Role in the United Arab Republic

When the union between Egypt and Syria was declared, Sarraj, a staunch supporter of Egyptian president Gamal Abdel Nasser, was handed a key position in the cabinet as Minister of Interior. His position was elevated when the Syrian gendarmerie, the desert patrol, and the Department of General Security were transferred to his jurisdiction on 13 March 1958. Following the resignation of Ba'ath party ministers from the UAR government, Sarraj was given the additional appointments of Minister of Social Affairs and Minister of Awqaf on 1 January 1960.

On 20 September 1960, he was appointed President of the Syrian Executive Council (SEC). Sarraj, at age 35, became the most powerful Syrian official in the UAR. Besides being interior minister and president of the SEC, he also headed the Syrian branch of Nasser's National Union party and was chairman of the Syrian economic foundation established in March 1960. A British official visiting Damascus described him as the "Viceroy of Syria". However, his use of police methods, which were seen as ruthless, and his considerable power made him unpopular in Syria. Nonetheless, he was known to be an impeccable Arab nationalist who could "get things done." Pressure was exerted on Nasser to remove Sarraj from power, but he refused, feeling that there was no one more fit to run Syria on his behalf. Eventually, in August 1961, Nasser decided to appoint him vice president, relocating him to Cairo and thus heralding his downfall as Syria's de facto leader.

On 18 September, when Nasser merged the two branches of the National Union, therefore depriving Sarraj of his position as Secretary-General of the Syrian branch and when Egyptian vice president Abdel Hakim Amer dismissed one of his closest associates, Sarraj submitted his resignation. The UAR's state minister, Abdel Qadir Hatem, was sent to mediate between Sarraj and Amer, but failed and the former began mobilizing his forces on 19–20 September. Realizing an operation against Nasser was unlikely to succeed, he agreed to meet Nasser and Amer in Cairo. Although Nasser condemned Sarraj for his ambition to be sole ruler of Syria, he replaced Amer as Minister of Syrian Affairs with Mahmoud Riad. Resuming his post as Syria's vice president, Sarraj also headed a ministerial committee for UAR administrative reform. However, he suddenly submitted a second resignation on 26 September and Nasser accepted it, sending Amer to replace him.

Later life and death

On 28 September 1961, a coup by disaffected officers occurred in Syria, dissolving the UAR. Sarraj was arrested and jailed in the Mezzeh Prison of Damascus. He escaped from the prison and left Syria for Beirut, Lebanon. In 1964 the Syrian Socialist Nationalist Party (SSNP) attempted to assassinate Sarraj, prompting his flight to Egypt where he made amends with Nasser. Sarraj lived in Cairo as a private citizen, serving as a director of social security. In 2004 he was reportedly still living in Cairo. However, former defence minister Mustafa Tlass had been lobbying the Syrian government for the return of Sarraj to Syria. According to al-Ahram Weekly, he was expected to return in late 2005.

Sarraj did not return to Syria and died in Cairo on 23 September 2013. He had requested to be buried in Syria, but due to the unstable security condition of the country amid the civil war, he was buried in Cairo.

Further reading

References

Citations

Bibliography

1925 births
2013 deaths
Syrian colonels
Syrian ministers of interior
People from Hama
Vice-presidents of Egypt
Arab Socialist Union (Egypt) politicians
Syrian Arab nationalists
Syrian anti-communists
Syrian people of the 1948 Arab–Israeli War
Egyptian mass murderers
Syrian emigrants to Egypt
Prime Ministers of Syria
Syrian Kurdish politicians